Ramon "Mon" Jose is a Filipino basketball coach who serving as one of the three assistant coaches under Chito Victolero of the Magnolia Hotshots in the PBA.

Education 
He also played for the De La Salle Green Archers from 1997 to 2000 under Franz Pumaren. Coached by Franz Pumaren, he played with Renren Ritualo, future San Juan Mayor Francis Zamora, Don Allado, and Dino Aldeguer who made a famous crucial shot in 1999 UAAP Basketball Finals Game 3.

Playing career 
Jose was drafted by Pop Cola Panthers in the PBA, but only played for one season after Panthers was disbanded.

Coaching career
Jose coached a lot of teams, including the De La Salle Women’s Team, Centro Escolar University Men’s Basketball Team and the RP Youth Team (3 on 3 Basketball) which participated in the 1st Youth Olympic Games in 2010. As assistant coach, he has provided support, training and inspiration to the men’s basketball teams of recently crowned UAAP Champions National University and College of Saint Benilde as well as Hapee Toothpaste for the Philippine Basketball League and Coca-Cola Tigers at the PBA. In 2014, he was tapped as assistant coach for the Star Hotshots, with another former Green Archers Jason Webb and Tonyboy Espinosa.

References

External links 
 http://goarchers.com/13723/de-la-salle-green-archers-now/

Filipino men's basketball coaches
Filipino men's basketball players
Living people
Magnolia Hotshots coaches
De La Salle Green Archers basketball players
Year of birth missing (living people)
Pop Cola Panthers coaches
Benilde Blazers basketball coaches
Powerade Tigers coaches
NU Bulldogs basketball coaches
De La Salle Green Archers basketball coaches